This is a list of television programs currently and formerly broadcast by Sony YAY!.The channel was launched on 18 April 2017.

Current programming 
 Bernard
 Chimpoo Simpoo
 Chorr Police 
 Honey Bunny (Reloaded)
 Ding Dong Bell - Masti Ka Khel
 Guru Aur Bhole
 Harry & Bunnie
 Horrid Henry
 Kicko & Super Speedo
 Kikoumba
 Mr. Magoo
 Naruto
 Oggy and the Cockroaches
 Obbochama-kun
 Oggy and the Cockroaches: Next Generation
 Paap-O-Meter
 PaJaMa
 Pyaar Mohabbat Happy Lucky
 Robotan
 The Owl & Co
 Sergeant Keroro
 HaGoLa
 Oscar's Oasis
 Taarak Mehta Kka Chhota Chashmah

Former programming 
 Bobby & Bill
 Casper's Scare School
 Fab5 Mission Tango
 Kikoriki
 Krishna Balram
 Kong: The Animated Series
 Little Spirou
 Magical Hat
 Marude Dameo
 Me and My Robot
 Mother Goose Club
 Mirette Investigates
 Paper Port
 Prince Jai Aur Dumdaar Viru
 Ratz
 Space Goofs
 Tensai Bakabon
 Trust Me I am a Genie

Films 

 Guru Aur Bhole In Kung Fu Adventure
 Guru Aur Bhole In Magic Kingdom
 Guru Aur Bhole In Bermuda Triangle
 Guru Aur Bhole In Alien Busters
 Guru Aur Bhole: The Gladiators
 Honey Bunny Gangs of Film City
 Honey Bunny in Police Patrol
 Honey Bunny in The World Tour Challenge
 Honey Bunny Save The Panda
 Paap-O-Meter Defenders of Earth
 Paap-O-Meter Under Attack
 Sab Jholmaal Hai – Bank Robbery (21 October 2017)
 Sab Jholmaal Hai – Honey Bunny Ka Space Adventure (24 December 2017)
 Tapu and the Big Fat Alien Wedding
 Oggy and the Cockroaches The Movie

References 

Lists of television series by network
Lists of Indian television series